The Treason Act 1842 (5 & 6 Vict. c.51) is an Act of the Parliament of the United Kingdom of Great Britain and Ireland. It was passed early in the reign of Queen Victoria. The last person to be convicted under the Act was Jaswant Singh Chail, on 3 February 2023, to be sentenced on 31 March 2023. He was the first person in more than 40 years to be convicted.

Background
On 29 May 1842, Victoria was riding in a carriage along The Mall, London, when John Francis, described by Victoria's husband Prince Albert as a "little, swarthy, ill-looking rascal ... of the age of twenty-six to thirty, with a shabby hat and of dirty appearance", aimed a pistol at her but did not fire. The following day, Victoria drove the same route, though faster and with a greater escort, in a deliberate attempt to provoke Francis to take a second aim and catch him in the act. As expected, Francis shot at her, but he was seized by plain clothes policemen, tried, and convicted of high treason. Francis's death sentence was commuted to transportation for life on 1 July. Two days later, in a similar attack, John William Bean fired a pistol at the Queen, but it was loaded only with paper and tobacco.

Edward Oxford, who had shot at Victoria in 1840, felt that the attempts were encouraged by his acquittal on the grounds of insanity two years before. Bean's assault, though physically harmless, was still punishable by death. Feeling that such a penalty was too harsh, Albert encouraged Parliament to pass a law recognising lesser crimes against the monarch, such as intent to alarm. Bean was sentenced to 18 months in gaol.

Section 1
In 19th century Britain, treason had its own special rules of evidence and procedure, which made it difficult to prosecute traitors successfully, such as the requirement that the prosecution produce two witnesses to the same overt act, or that three judges preside at the trial (see Treason Act 1695 for details). The Treason Act 1800 relaxed these rules in relation to attempts on the King's life, bringing the rules in such cases in line with the less restrictive rules which then existed in ordinary murder cases. Section 1 of the 1842 Act went further, removing the special rules in all cases of treason involving any attempt to wound or maim the King.

This section was repealed on 15 June 1945 by the Treason Act 1945. This repeal was consequential on the extension of the ordinary rules of evidence and procedure to all forms of treason by section 1 of that Act.

Section 2
This section is still in force. It created a new offence (less serious than treason) of assaulting the monarch, or of having a firearm or offensive weapon in his presence with intent to injure or alarm him or to cause a breach of the peace. In 1981, Marcus Sarjeant was sentenced to five years on pleading guilty to firing blank shots at Queen Elizabeth II when she was on parade. The previous use of this Section was in 1966, when John Francis Morgan was convicted for throwing a concrete block out of a building onto the Queen's car during a royal visit to Belfast.

On 2 August 2022, Jaswant Singh Chail was charged with offences under section 2 of the Treason Act, 1842. He had been arrested in the grounds of Windsor Castle on 25 December 2021; he was charged with "discharging or aiming firearms, or throwing or using any offensive matter or weapon, with intent to injure or alarm her Majesty". He pleaded guilty on 3 February 2023 at the Old Bailey. His sentencing is scheduled for 31 March 2023.

Sentence

Today, a person convicted of an offence under this section is liable to imprisonment for a term not exceeding seven years. Originally, an attempt to assault or alarm the monarch was made punishable by flogging and up to seven years' imprisonment. No-one who violated the act was ever flogged.

Relevant cases
R v. Francis (1842) 4 State Tr N.S. 1376
R v. Bean (1842) 4 State Tr N.S. 1382
R v. Hamilton (1849) 7 State Tr N.S. 1130
Pate's Case (1850) 8 State Tr N.S. 1

Section 3
This section is also still in force, and provides that section 2 does not affect the penalty for treason. However, although under the Treason Act 1795 many kinds of assault on the monarch were treason, that Act was repealed in 1998. Under the present law, in Great Britain it is now only treason to "compass or imagine" the monarch's death. Consequently, assaulting the monarch is only treason if it proves that state of mind.

In Northern Ireland intending or causing "any bodily harm" to the King remains treason under the Treason Act (Ireland) 1537.

See also
 High treason in the United Kingdom
 Treason Act

References

Hibbert, Christopher (2000) Queen Victoria: A Personal History, London: HarperCollins, 
Poole, Steve (2000) The Politics of Regicide in England, 1760–1850: Troublesome Subjects, Manchester: Manchester University Press, 
St Aubyn, Giles (1991) Queen Victoria: A Portrait, London: Sinclair-Stevenson,

External links
Hansard (House of Commons), 12 July 1842, vol.65, col. 19 - 28 (first and second reading)
Hansard (House of Commons), 13 July 1842, vol.65, col. 80 - 84 (committee)
Hansard (House of Commons), 13 July 1842, vol.65, col. 99 (third reading)
Hansard (House of Lords), 14 July 1842, vol.65, col. 100 - 101 (first reading)
Hansard (House of Commons), 15 July 1842, vol.65, col. 182 - 184 (report)
Hansard (House of Lords), 15 July 1842, vol.65, col. 167 - 171 (second reading)

United Kingdom Acts of Parliament 1842
1842 in British law
Treason in the United Kingdom